Hertník is a village and municipality in Bardejov District in the Prešov Region of north-east Slovakia.

History

Hertník originated around 1300 and is associated with the Mongol invasion of Europe of 1241–1242. Following the invasion, Béla IV of Hungary donated his estates to his patricians. The noblemen of the northern Šariš region initiated resettlement of plundered and decimated areas (some regions experienced 50% loss of the original population) by inviting German colonists. The incoming Germans (mostly from the Baltic Sea area) were usually craftsmen, traders and miners. The arriving Germans settled in or immediately next to the older Slovak settlements. The legacy of German colonization from that era in the eastern Čergov mountains is manifested in German names of the settlements and other geographical features that have survived to the present time. Etymologically, the name Hertník is derived from the German word Herkenecht (meaning master servant); likewise, nearby villages Šiba (Scheibe), Richvald (Reichwald) and Kľušov (Schonwald).

The oldest recorded mention of the village Hertník is from 1351 and can be found in the statement issued by Spišská Kapitula (one of the medieval Hungary's "places of authentication") which confirms that Hertník belonged to the Lords of Perín (Perényi, a noble Hungarian family). Mikuláš from Perín reconfirmed this claim later in a statement issued in 1355 where he declared that Hertník, Šiba, Richvald and Kľušov were in the possession of the Perín family since 1325. Hertník belonged to the Perins until around 1440 when a free royal town of Bardejov became a new owner. In 1442 a Richnava's Bratrík captain Ján Talafúz seized Hertník and other villages from Bardejov. However, in 1446 Hertník was repossessed by Bardejov (the church of Saint Aegidius).

During the following decades (~1480–1553) Hertník changed several owners (János Szapolyai, Ferdinand I, Bernard Baran, Hieronym Lasky and Matej Lobocký). From 1553 until the abolishment of serfdom by Joseph II, Holy Roman Emperor in 1781 Hertník belonged for the most part to the Forgách (Forgáč, Forgács) family.

Geography
The municipality lies at an altitude of 460 metres and covers an area of 17.975 km2.
It has a population of about 1000 people.

See also
 List of municipalities and towns in Slovakia

References

Genealogical resources

The records for genealogical research are available at the state archive "Statny Archiv in Presov, Slovakia"

 Roman Catholic church records (births/marriages/deaths): 1856-1897 (parish A)
 Greek Catholic church records (births/marriages/deaths): 1800-1895 (parish B)
 Lutheran church records (births/marriages/deaths): 1703-1895 (parish B)

External links
 
 
Surnames of living people in Hertnik

Villages and municipalities in Bardejov District
Šariš